Saint Anysia of Salonika was a Christian virgin and martyr of the 4th century. Anysia was born to a wealthy and pious Christian family in what is now Thessaloniki. She dedicated herself to vows of chastity and poverty, praying and helping the poor.

Background
The legend of her martyrdom states that, in 304, a Roman soldier apprehended her as she was on her way to Mass. Discovering she was a Christian, he beat her, and intended to drag her to a pagan temple to sacrifice to Roman gods. When he tore off her veil (a reminder of her vow of chastity), she spat in his face, and he murdered her.

References

304 deaths
Ancient Greeks who were murdered
Saints of Roman Thessalonica
4th-century Christian martyrs
4th-century Roman women
4th-century Christian saints
284 births
Late Ancient Christian female saints